Bayuemas Oval is a cricket stadium located in Pandamaran, Klang, Malaysia. The first recorded match on this ground was in season 2004.

The ground is designed and constructed by the New Zealand Sports Turf Institute. It features like saucer for excellent drainage system. It also hosted matches during 2011 ICC World Cricket League Division Six, 2012 ICC World Cricket League Division Four and 2014 ICC World Cricket League Division Five. 

Bayuemas Oval hosted its first International cricket match between Afghanistan and Hong Kong in ACC Premier League in 2014 where Afghanistan won by 6 wickets.

References

External links

 CricketArchive 
 Bayuemas Oval, cricinfo

Cricket grounds in Malaysia
Sports venues in Selangor